The Naked City (aka Naked City) is a 1948 American film noir produced by Mark Hellinger, directed by Jules Dassin, written by Albert Maltz and Malvin Wald, and starring Barry Fitzgerald, Howard Duff, Dorothy Hart and Don Taylor. The influential film, shot almost entirely on location in New York City, depicts the police investigation that follows the murder of a young model.

Naked City received two Academy Awards, one for cinematography for William H. Daniels and another for film editing to Paul Weatherwax. In 2007, the film was selected for preservation in the United States National Film Registry by the Library of Congress as being "culturally, historically, or aesthetically significant".

Plot
In the late hours of a hot New York summer night, a pair of men subdue and kill Jean Dexter, an ex-model, by knocking her out with chloroform and drowning her in her bathtub. When one of the murderers gets conscience-stricken while drunk, the other kills him and throws his body into the East River.

Homicide Detective Lt. Dan Muldoon and his young associate, Det. Jimmy Halloran, are assigned to Jean's case, which the medical examination has determined was murder. Muldoon has been a homicide cop for 22 years, Halloran for three months. At the scene, the police interrogate Martha Swenson, Jean's housekeeper, about Jean's boyfriends, and she tells them about a "Mr. Philip Henderson". They also discover a bottle of sleeping pills and her address book. Halloran questions the doctor who prescribed the pills, Lawrence Stoneman, and Ruth Morrison, another model and Jean's friend. Back at the police station, Muldoon questions Frank Niles, Jean's ex-boyfriend, who lies about everything, claiming only a business relationship with Jean and denying knowing Ruth. Because of his lies, Niles becomes the prime suspect. Later, Muldoon deduces from the bruises on Jean's neck that she was killed by at least two men.

That evening, Jean's parents, Mr. and Mrs. Batory, from whom Jean was estranged, arrive in New York to formally identify the body and tell the detectives that they have no knowledge of Jean's acquaintances. The next morning, the detectives learn that Niles sold a gold cigarette case stolen from Stoneman, then purchased a one-way airline ticket to Mexico. They also discover that one of Jean's rings was stolen from the home of a wealthy Mrs. Hylton. At Mrs. Hylton's Park Avenue apartment, the police learn that the ring actually belonged to her socialite daughter, who, to their surprise, turns out to be Ruth Morrison (having retained the name of Mrs. Hylton's previous husband).

Learning that Ruth's engagement ring is also stolen property, and that she is engaged to Niles, Muldoon and Halloran take Ruth to Niles' apartment, where they coincidentally interrupt someone trying to murder him. The killer takes a shot at the cops and escapes down the fire escape onto the nearby elevated train. When questioned about the stolen jewelry, Niles claims that they were all presents from Jean, which reveals his true relationship with her, much to Ruth's chagrin. Ruth realizes she is engaged to a swindler and slaps him. Niles is then arrested for the jewel thefts, but the murder case remains open.

Halloran learns that a body recovered from the East River, is that of small-time burglar Peter Backalis, who died within hours of the Dexter murder, and Halloran believes the two incidents are connected. Muldoon, although skeptical, lets him pursue the lead and assigns two veteran detectives on the squad to help Halloran with the legwork. Through further methodical but tedious investigation, Halloran discovers that Backalis's accomplice on a jewelry store burglary was Willie Garzah, a former wrestler who plays the harmonica. While Halloran and his team canvass the Lower East Side of New York using an old publicity photograph of Garzah, Muldoon compels Niles to identify Jean's mystery boyfriend. He reveals that Dr. Stoneman is "Henderson". At Stoneman's office, Muldoon uses Niles to trap the married, respectable physician into confessing that he fell in love with Jean, only to learn that she and Niles were using him in order to rob his society friends. Niles then confesses that Garzah killed Jean and Backalis. Halloran and Muldoon, using different approaches, have come up with the same killer.

Meanwhile, Halloran finally locates Garzah and, pretending that Backalis is in the hospital, tries to trick Garzah into accompanying him, but Garzah (knowing he killed Backalis) sees through the ruse. The ex-wrestler rabbit punches the rookie detective, momentarily knocking him unconscious. Garzah attempts to disappear in the crowded city, but as police descend upon the neighborhood, he panics and draws attention to himself when he shoots and kills a blind man's guide dog on the pedestrian walk of the Williamsburg Bridge. Garzah attempts to flee over the bridge but, as police approach from both directions, he starts climbing one of the towers and is shot and wounded. High on the tower, Garzah refuses to surrender; gunfire is exchanged, and he is hit again and falls to his death.

As the skyline and street shots of New York are shown and a trashman sweeps up yesterday's newspapers, the narration concludes by saying "There are eight million stories in the naked city. This has been one of them."

Cast

 Barry Fitzgerald as Detective Lt. Dan Muldoon
 Howard Duff as Frank Niles
 Dorothy Hart as Ruth Morrison
 Don Taylor as Detective Jimmy Halloran
 Frank Conroy as Captain Donahue
 Ted de Corsia as Willie Garzah
 House Jameson as Dr. Lawrence Stoneman
 Anne Sargent as Mrs. Halloran
 Adelaide Klein as Mrs. Paula Batory
 Grover Burgess as Mr. Batory
 Tom Pedi as Detective Perelli
 Enid Markey as Mrs. Edgar Hylton
 Walter Burke as Pete Backalis
 Virginia Mullen as Martha Swenson
 Mark Hellinger as Narrator
 Lee Shumway as Patrolman (uncredited)

Production
Producer Mark Hellinger, who also narrated the film, was only 44 when he died of a heart attack on December 21, 1947, after reviewing the final cut of the film at his home.

The visual style of The Naked City was inspired by New York photographer Weegee, who published a book of photographs of New York life titled Naked City (1945). Weegee was hired as a visual consultant on the film, and is credited with helping to craft its imagery. But film historian William Park has argued that, despite Weegee's work on the film and its title coming from Weegee's earlier work, the film owes its visual style more to Italian neorealism rather than Weegee's photographic work.

The movie features the uncredited film debuts of Kathleen Freeman, Bruce Gordon, James Gregory, Nehemiah Persoff, and John Randolph in small roles. Randolph, along with Paul Ford, who also had a small part, was appearing at the time on the New York stage in Command Decision. John Marley, Arthur O'Connell, David Opatoshu, and Molly Picon had small, uncredited roles.

The musical scoring process was contentious. Hellinger allowed Dassin to assign a former M-G-M colleague, the arranger George Bassman, to compose the music. Hellinger found this so unsatisfactory that, on the night before he died, he begged his own first choice, Miklós Rózsa, to step in. Rózsa concentrated on the climactic chase and epilogue, while Frank Skinner scored the early scenes. Rózsa later compiled a "Mark Hellinger Suite" of music from his three Hellinger pictures (including The Killers and Brute Force). The Naked City epilogue, "Song of a Great City," was Rózsa's tribute to the producer.

Reception

Box office
The film was a considerable hit at the box office.

Critical reception
Film critic Bosley Crowther, while having problems with the script, liked the location shooting and wrote, "Thanks to the actuality filming of much of its action in New York, a definite parochial fascination is liberally assured all the way and the seams in a none-too-good whodunnit are rather cleverly concealed. And thanks to a final, cops-and-robbers 'chase' through East Side Manhattan and on the Williamsburg Bridge, a generally talkative mystery story is whipped up to a roaring 'Hitchcock' end."

In July 2018, it was selected to be screened in the Venice Classics section at the 75th Venice International Film Festival.

Awards and honors
Wins
 Academy Awards: Oscar, Best Cinematography, Black-and-White, William H. Daniels; Best Film Editing, Paul Weatherwax; 1949.

Nominations
 Academy Awards: Oscar, Best Writing, Motion Picture Story, Malvin Wald; 1949.
 British Academy of Film and Television Arts: BAFTA Film Award, Best Film from any Source, USA; 1949.
 Writers Guild of America: WGA Award (Screen), Best Written American Drama, Albert Maltz and Malvin Wald; The Robert Meltzer Award (Screenplay Dealing Most Ably with Problems of the American Scene), Albert Maltz and Malvin Wald; 1949.

Adaptations
 The film was the inspiration for a half-hour television series of the same name, which used the film's famous concluding line. The characters of Muldoon and Halloran initially returned in the series, but they were now played by John McIntire and James Franciscus. The series ran for a single season in 1958 to 1959, earning an Emmy Award nomination as Best Drama. It was resurrected in Fall 1960 as an hour-long drama, which ran from October 1960 to September 1963.
 The film inspired two television films, Naked City: Justice with a Bullet and Naked City: A Killer Christmas, starring Scott Glenn as Muldoon and Courtney B. Vance as Halloran. They aired on Showtime in October and December 1998 respectively.
 A case directly based on the plot of The Naked City was included as DLC for the 2011 video game L.A. Noire, featuring similar characters and an ending where the culprit is killed as he tries to climb up a tower.

References

Bibliography
 Eagan, Daniel. America's Film Legacy: The Authoritative Guide to the Landmark Movies in the National Film Registry. New York: Continuum, 2010.
 Krutnik, Frank. "Un-American" Hollywood: Politics and Film in the Blacklist Era. New Brunswick, N.J.: Rutgers University Press, 2008.
 Lewis, Jon and Smoodin, Eric Loren. Looking Past the Screen: Case Studies in American Film History and Method. Durham, N.C.: Duke University Press, 2007.
 Naremore, James. More Than Night: Film Noir in Its Contexts. Berkeley, Calif.: University of California Press, 2008.
 Newcomb, Horace. Encyclopedia of Television. Vol. 1. New York: CRC Press, 2004.
 Park, William. What Is Film Noir? Lewisburg, Pa.: Bucknell University Press, 2011.
 Sadoul, Georges and Morris, Peter. Dictionary of Films. Berkeley, Calif.: University of California Press, 1972.
 Spicer, Andrew. Historical Dictionary of Film Noir. Lanham, Md.: Scarecrow Press, 2010.
 Wald, Marvin; Maltz, Albert; and Bruccoli, Matthew Joseph. The Naked City: A Screenplay. Carbondale, Ill.: Southern Illinois University Press, 1948.
 Willett, Ralph. The Naked City: Urban Crime Fiction in the USA. Manchester, UK: Manchester University Press, 1996.

External links

1948 films
1948 crime drama films
American black-and-white films
American crime drama films
American mystery films
Culture of New York City
1940s English-language films
Fictional portrayals of the New York City Police Department
Film noir
Films adapted into television shows
Films directed by Jules Dassin
Films scored by Miklós Rózsa
Films set in New York City
Films shot in New York City
Films whose cinematographer won the Best Cinematography Academy Award
Films whose editor won the Best Film Editing Academy Award
Films about the New York City Police Department
American police detective films
1940s police procedural films
United States National Film Registry films
Films scored by Frank Skinner
1948 mystery films
Universal Pictures films
1940s American films